Hussain Ahamed Bhaila (born 18 May 1949) is a Sri Lankan politician, a former member of the Parliament of Sri Lanka and a former government minister.

References

1949 births
Government ministers of Sri Lanka
Living people
Members of the 13th Parliament of Sri Lanka
Sri Lanka Muslim Congress politicians
Sri Lankan Moor politicians
United People's Freedom Alliance politicians